The 1996 Turkish Cup Final was a football match played over two legs in April 1996. It was the final and deciding match of the 1995–96 Turkish Cup.

First Match

Second match

References

1996
Turkish Cup Final 1996
Galatasaray S.K. (football) matches